Mount Royal Academy is a private, Roman Catholic pre-K, elementary and high school in Sunapee, New Hampshire.  It is located in the Roman Catholic Diocese of Manchester.

Background
Mount Royal Academy is a private Catholic school nestled in the hills of New Hampshire's Dartmouth - Lake Sunapee Region.  What began as an elementary school (Kindergarten through 8), has grown to include a preschool with three-and-four-year-old programs and a liberal arts college preparatory High School. 

In 1994, a group of parents who wanted their children to receive an authentic Catholic education modeled after the classical liberal arts curriculum. After traveling on pilgrimage to St. Joseph's Oratory of Mount Royal, they resolved to found a private, independent school that was faithful to the Catholic church.

More than 20 years later, Mount Royal Academy thrives. A member of the National Association of Private Catholic and Independent Schools, it currently educates over 200 students in pre-k through grade 12. The school falls under the ecclesiastical authority of the bishop of Manchester, but the diocese neither oversees it nor funds it.

Notes and references

External links

 School website

Roman Catholic Diocese of Manchester
Catholic secondary schools in New Hampshire
Schools in Sullivan County, New Hampshire
Educational institutions established in 1994
Sunapee, New Hampshire
1994 establishments in New Hampshire